Richard Kay Hart (born March 4, 1943) is a former American football guard in the National Football League. Hart played minor league baseball in the Milwaukee Braves organization from 1961 to 1965 and did not play college football. He signed with the Philadelphia Eagles in 1966. He also played for the Buffalo Bills.

References

External links

 
1943 births
Living people
Players of American football from Pennsylvania
American football offensive guards
Philadelphia Eagles players
Buffalo Bills players
Wellsville Braves players
Dublin Braves players
Cedar Rapids Braves players
Boise Braves players
Yakima Braves players
Austin Senators players
Sportspeople from Bucks County, Pennsylvania
Baseball players from Pennsylvania
People from Morrisville, Pennsylvania